Asota egens is a species of noctuoid moths in the family Erebidae. It is found from Japan and the Oriental tropics, east to New Guinea.

The wingspan is 54–60 mm.

The larvae have been recorded on Ficus species.

Subspecies
Asota egens andamana (Andaman Islands)
Asota egens confinis (Philippines: Luzon, Mindanao and Sibuyan island)
Asota egens egens (China, India, Indonesia, Japan, Peninsula Malaysia, Philippines, Singapore, Taiwan, Thailand and Vietnam)
Asota egens indica (India)
Asota egens intermissa (Indonesia)
Asota egens inversa (Indonesia)
Asota egens macrosticta (Enggano)
Asota egens nebulosa (Borneo)
Asota egens onusta (Nias)
Asota egens reducta (Philippines: Palawan, Mindoro)
Asota egens sumbana (Sumba)

References

External links 
 egens egens info
 The Moths of Borneo

Asota (moth)
Moths of Asia
Moths described in 1854